"Fire on the Mountain" is a song by the Grateful Dead. It was written by lyricist Robert Hunter and composed by drummer Mickey Hart. It was commercially released on the album Shakedown Street in November 1978. An earlier instrumental version titled "Happiness is Drumming" appeared in 1976 on Mickey Hart's album Diga with the Diga Rhythm Band.

Prior to the Dead recording, the song premiered at a concert on March 18, 1977 in San Francisco. That night, as almost always, it was coupled with "Scarlet Begonias" during live performances, producing lengthy musical improvisations. The paired songs were soon nicknamed "Scarlet Fire". The sequence typically timed from 20 to 25 minutes.  The November 1, 1979 performance at Nassau Coliseum, Uniondale, New York, likely the longest, clocks in over 34 minutes.

"Fire on the Mountain" was performed in concert by the Grateful Dead 253 times between 1977 and 1995.  It appears on numerous Grateful Dead albums.  An outtake of the song appeared as a bonus track on the 2004 reissue of Terrapin Station.

This song is also featured as downloadable content for the video game Rock Band.

Cover versions
Leftover Salmon parodied the song with a version called "Pasta On the Mountain", which appeared on their 1993 release Bridges to Bert.
In a 2000 show at Solebury High School in New Hope, Pennsylvania, the band Ween played a cover of the song live.
In 2008, Keller Williams released a bluegrass version of the song on the album Rex (Live at the Fillmore).
Daniel Donato covered the song on his 2020 album A Young Man's Country
Mt. Joy played a cover of the song at the Capitol Theatre on April 11, 2022.

See also
Dark Star

References

External links
Dead.net, the official site of the Grateful Dead

1978 songs
Grateful Dead songs
Songs with lyrics by Robert Hunter (lyricist)